The 2018 Korean Tour was the eighth season of the Korean Tour to carry Official World Golf Ranking points. The season consisted of 17 events, three of which are co-sanctioned by the Asian Tour. All the tournaments had prize funds of at least 500 million won (approximately US$480,000). Nine have prize funds of 1 billion won ($960,000) or more.

Schedule
The following table lists official events during the 2018 season.

Order of Merit
The Order of Merit was titled as the Genesis Points and was based on prize money won during the season, calculated using a points-based system. The leading player on the tour (not otherwise exempt) earned status to play on the 2019 European Tour.

Notes

References

External links

2018 Korean Tour
2018 in golf
2018 in South Korean sport